The episodes of the Japanese anime series Library War are directed by Takayuki Hamana and animated and produced by Production I.G. Based on a series of light novels by Hiro Arikawa, it tells the story of a future Japan that needs libraries and their Library Team Defense Forces to protect books and stop censorship at the hands of the Media Betterment Committee, a special censorship agency established by the Japanese government.

The series premiered in Japan on April 10, 2008, on Fuji TV's Noitamina programming block and ran until June 26, 2008. Kadokawa released the series to five DVD compilations, each containing three episode except for the first two, which contained two each. The third volume contained an unaired episode and was released as an original video animation. The DVDs were released between August 6 and December 3, 2008.

Two pieces of theme music are used for the episodes: one opening theme and one ending theme. The ending theme is "Changes" by Base Ball Bear.


Episode listing

References

Library War